Parliamentary elections were held in Romania on 30 November 1952. They were the second held under undisguised Communist rule, and the first under a constitution adopted that September. They were also the first held after longtime Prime Minister Petru Groza handed the post to Gheorghe Gheorghiu-Dej, who as leader of the Communist Romanian Workers' Party (PMR) had been the country's de facto leader since the Communists seized full power in 1947.

Voters were presented with a single slate of candidates from the People's Democratic Front, which was dominated by PMR.  The Front won all 428 seats in the Great National Assembly.  This election set the tone for all elections held in Romania until 1989.  For the remainder of the Communist era, voters only had the choice of approving or rejecting a Communist-dominated list.

Electoral system
The new constitution was promulgated on 24 September 1952 and three days later a new electoral law was passed. Under the new system candidates were elected in single member constituencies, and had to receive over 50% of the vote. If no candidate passed this threshold, or if voter turnout in the constituency was less than 50%, re-runs were held until the requirements were met. Candidates could be nominated by the People's Democratic Front or mass organisations, although the latter were monitored by the Front.

Results

References

Parliamentary elections in Romania
Romania
1952 in Romania
One-party elections
November 1952 events in Europe
1952 elections in Romania